Florin Tănase Cioabă (14 November 1954 – 18 August 2013) was a Romanian Romani Pentecostal minister and self-proclaimed "King of Roma Everywhere". He was the son of Ioan Cioabă, a Kalderash Romani leader. He died on 18 August 2013 of cardiac arrest at Akdeniz University in Antalya in Turkey. He was 58 years old.

References

1954 births
2013 deaths
Romanian Romani people
Kalderash people
Kings of the Gypsies
Romanian Protestant clergy
People from Târgu Cărbunești